Julens sånger is a 1985 Vikingarna Christmas album, recorded together with a children's choir.

Track listing

Side A
Nu tändas tusen juleljus
Jul, jul, strålande jul
Gläns över sjö och strand
White Christmas
Låt mig få tända ett ljus (Mozart's lullaby)
O Holy Night (Cantique de noël)

Side B
Stilla natt (Stille Nacht, heilige Nacht)
I kväll jag tänder ett ljus
När juldagsmorgon glimmar
När det lider mot jul (Det strålar en stjärna)
Bereden väg för Herran
Julen är här igen

Charts

References 

1985 Christmas albums
Vikingarna (band) albums
Christmas albums by Swedish artists
Swedish-language albums